Carbonea is a genus of fungi in the  family Lecanoraceae. Most of the species grow on lichens. The genus is widespread, and contains 20 species. Carbonea was originally circumscribed as a subgenus of Lecidea in 1967 before it was promoted to generic status in 1983.

Species
Carbonea agellata 
Carbonea aggregantula 
Carbonea antarctica 
Carbonea assentiens 
Carbonea assimilis 
Carbonea atronivea 
Carbonea austroshetlandica 
Carbonea gallowayi 
Carbonea hypopurpurea  – Falkland Islands
Carbonea intrudens 
Carbonea invadens 
Carbonea latypizodes 
Carbonea montevidensis 
Carbonea neuropogonis 
Carbonea nivaria 
Carbonea phaeostoma 
Carbonea subdeclinans 
Carbonea supersparsa 
Carbonea tephromelae  – Sweden
Carbonea viriduloatra 
Carbonea vitellinaria 
Carbonea vorticosa

References

Lecanoraceae
Lecanorales genera
Taxa described in 1967
Taxa named by Hannes Hertel
Lichen genera